Joseph Quick (1877 – April 27, 1969) was a United States Navy coxswain who received the Medal of Honor for rescuing his  shipmate, Machinist's Mate Second Class Walenty Wisnieroski, from drowning on April 27, 1902, in port in Yokohama, Japan.

Biography
Joseph Quick was born in 1877 in New York City. He joined the Navy from Yokohama in 1897 and retired in 1905.

He died in 1969 and is buried in The Evergreens Cemetery in Brooklyn, New York.  His grave can be found at Main Section lot 773.

Medal of Honor citation
Rank and organization: Coxwain, U.S. Navy. Place and date: Yokohama, Japan, April 27, 1902. Entered service at: New York. Birth: New York. G.O. No.: 93, July 7, 1902.

Citation:

For heroism in rescuing Walenty Wisnieroski, Machinist Second Class, from drowning at Yokohama, Japan, 27 April 1902, while serving on board the U.S.S. Yorktown.

See also

List of Medal of Honor recipients during Peacetime
List of African American Medal of Honor recipients

References

Military personnel from New York City
1969 deaths
1877 births
United States Navy Medal of Honor recipients
United States Navy sailors
Non-combat recipients of the Medal of Honor